The city of Galveston, Texas experienced several hurricanes throughout its history, including:

1900 Galveston hurricane, the deadliest natural disaster in the history of the United States.
1915 Galveston hurricane
Hurricane Ike (2008) made landfall on Galveston.

See also
1943 Surprise Hurricane, which made landfall in Galveston County but not Galveston Island